Domenico Giordani, O.F.M. Obs. (died 1640) was a Roman Catholic prelate who served as Bishop of Isernia (1637–1640).

Biography
Domenico Giordani was born in Naples, Italy and ordained a priest in the Order of Observant Friars Minor.
On 17 August 1637, he was appointed during the papacy of Pope Urban VIII as Bishop of Isernia.
On 20 September 1637, he was consecrated bishop by Francesco Maria Brancaccio, Cardinal-Priest of Santi XII Apostoli, with Gaetano Cossa, Archbishop of Otranto, and Tommaso Carafa, Bishop Emeritus of Vulturara e Montecorvino, serving as co-consecrators. 
He served as Bishop of Isernia until his death on 11 February 1640.

References

External links and additional sources
 (for Chronology of Bishops) 
 (for Chronology of Bishops)  

17th-century Italian Roman Catholic bishops
Bishops appointed by Pope Urban VIII
1640 deaths
Observant Franciscan bishops